The 2007–08 season is Sydney FC's third season of football (soccer) in Australia.  The club finished seventh in the A-League Pre-season Challenge Cup and competed in the 2007–08 A-League season.

After a disappointing start to the season, the club sacked coach Branko Čulina in October, and appointed John Kosmina.  The team recovered from its poor start to finish third on the league table, securing a place in the finals series but being eliminated in the semi-final by Queensland Roar.

The club represented Australia at the Pan-Pacific Championship in February 2008 and finished fourth after losing to American MLS sides Houston Dynamo and Los Angeles Galaxy.

Player details

Squad
Players included in a Sydney FC squad in the 2007–08 season:

Transfers
With Branko Culina installed at the helm, he sought to reconstruct the Sydney squad which had been plagued by injuries and financial constraints the previous year.  Nikolai Topor-Stanley and Noel Spencer left for other A-League sides at the end of the Asian Champions League, but defender Nikolas Tsattalios was rewarded with a longer term contract.  New signings from foreign leagues were unveiled in American Michael Enfield, Brendon Santalab and World Cup Socceroo Tony Popović.  Popović's expected role in the club was further reinforced by being handed the captaincy for the A-League season. The club also fulfilled their youth player quota, signing Joey striker Ben Vidaic and winger Adam Biddle.

The club also sought to find a new marquee player as they had been unable to land a household-name since the departure of Dwight Yorke at the start of the previous season.  The club unsuccessfully courted a number of high-profile internationals including Philip Cocu, Robbie Fowler, Hakan Şükür, Christian Vieri, Jay-Jay Okocha and John Aloisi. On 3 August 2007 Sydney announced, (two days after media reports broke the story) that Brazilian international Juninho Paulista will be their marquee player on a one-year deal.  This came the same time as David Carney agreed to move to English side Sheffield United following speculation of his departure following the 2007 AFC Asian Cup.  Sydney finalised their squad by signing a second Brazilian in striker Patrick da Silva.

With the season kicking off, new reserve goalkeeper Ivan Necevski suffered an injury in training expected to keep him out of action for up to two months.  APIA Leichhardt custodian Matthew Nash impressed in his preseason trial to earn a short-term contract as cover.  As first round matches were underway with Nash on the bench, Sydney agreed terms with veteran John Filan to join the club, having recently returned home after retiring at Wigan. The short-term agreement fell through less than a week later, Filan citing outside issues.

In

Out

Short-term signings

Pre-season

AFC Champions League
As 2005–06 A-League Champions, Sydney qualified for the 2007 AFC Champions League as one of the two teams representing Australia along with 2005–06 League Premiers, Adelaide United. Group matches were played from March to May 2007, during the A-League off-season.  Sydney finished second in their group after two wins, three draws and one loss, a point behind Urawa Reds who progressed to the next stage of competition.

Squad preparation
For the new season, Sydney have established an agreement with Macquarie University to use the Sport and Aquatic Centre as a training base and also establishing an off-field relationship offering educational, corporate and research linkages. As part of preparations, the club staged a training camp on the Sunshine Coast with a match against a team of local players in the lead up to their opening Pre-season Cup match. Sydney will also play a series of friendly matches against NSW Premier League and State League sides, to engage with the Sydney football community. These friendlies and Pre-season Cup matches also provided experience for trialling players Ben Vidaic, Cameron Watson, Daniel Severino, Robbie Cattanach, Shannon Cole, Chris Nunes, former short-term Sydney player Tolgay Özbey and goalkeepers Vendram Janjetovic and Matthew Nash.

Friendly matches

2007 A-League Pre-season Cup

The Pre-season Cup competition consists of two groups of four teams, each team to play each other once.  All teams then progress to a playoff stage with opponents based on group position, followed by finals series to determine the cup winner.  Sydney finished the group stage bottom of Group B behind Central Coast Mariners, Queensland Roar and Wellington Phoenix.  After a loss and a win in the final placings matches, they were ranked seventh.

Group stage

Playoffs

2007–08 A-League

On 5 August, David Carney was transferred for A$125,000 to English Championship side, Sheffield United. The former Sydney player signed a three-year deal with the club which has been reported to earn him around A$1.25 million a year.

New players including former Socceroos regular Tony Popovic and former LA Galaxy Attacking Midfielder, Michael Enfield have signed with Sydney for the upcoming season. On 3 August 2007 Brazilian international Juninho Paulista, formerly of Celtic and Middlesbrough, signed with Sydney FC as their marquee player. Sydney have also announced the signings of youth players Ben Vidaic and Adam Biddle.

Former Socceroos Tony Popovic has been named the new skipper alongside current Socceroos Mark Milligan as vice-captain for the coming 2007–08 season.

On 15 October 2007 Michael Bridges was signed on a loan with Sydney FC, until the end of the 2007–08 season of the Hyundai A-League as a replacement for long-term casualty Michael Enfield, who has been ruled out for several months after sustaining a serious knee injury.

On 22 October 2007, it was announced that Branko Culina would be sacked from the club following disappointing results.  It was announced on 23 October, that former Adelaide United coach John Kosmina will take the role as the new head coach of Sydney FC.

Kosmina got the side of to a flying start under his tenure, his first match in charge, a clash with then table-topping rivals Central Coast, a thrilling 3–2 victory in front of a crowd of nearly 18,000 at the SFS, a sign of bigger things to come for the Blues. This was followed by an impressive 1–0 away victory over Newcastle Jets; with former England junior Michael Bridges recording his first goal for Sydney FC. An entertaining 0–0 draw at the Telstra Dome, with rivals Melbourne, followed, with Sydney FC still undefeated under Kosmina.

Sydney FC suffered their first loss under John Kosmina on 15 December losing 4–2 to bottom side Perth Glory. Sydney goals were scored by Steve Corica and Michael Bridges.

On 22 December, a crucial match against the Central Coast Mariners resulted in a 5–4 victory in favour of Sydney.  The match, held at Bluetongue Central Coast Stadium, was described by critics as the best game ever to come from the A-League. The crucial win moved Sydney FC up by 3 points to 4th place on the ladder, overtaking Adelaide United. The win was especially savoured after Sydney were down 2–0 after 15 minutes. The controversial sending-off of Mariners goalkeeper Danny Vukovic in the 16th minute turned the match in favour of Sydney, who scored their 5th goal via an Ufuk Taly penalty with the final kick of the match in stoppage time.

On Friday 28 December 2007, Sydney FC came from behind for the second time in two weeks to defeat a 10-man Adelaide United 3–1 and keep its unbeaten away record intact in front of a record crowd of 25,039 in Adelaide. This result forced Adelaide down to 5th on the ladder. With 3rd place Newcastle Jets unable to secure a victory over Wellington Phoenix in Round 18, Sydney leap-frogged the Jets into 3rd place, with only 3 points behind the tied leaders.

A week later Sydney travelled across the Tasman to face Wellington Phoenix at Westpac Stadium. Sydney came out of this match once again victorious winning 2–0 with goals from Northern Ireland superstar Terry McFlynn and current leading goalscorer for Sydney, Alex Brosque. This kept them in 3rd position on the A-League ladder and in good contention for a finals berth. This win also ensured that the Phoenix would not reach the finals.

As of 30 December 2007 rumours suggesting that Sydney had signed Simon Colosimo from the Perth Glory and Newcastle Jets striker Mark Bridge for the 2008/09 Season. Although these rumours have been proved true, no statements have officially been released as neither player wanted to cause trouble at their present clubs.

On Sunday 13 January 2008 Sydney flew up to Brisbane to play the Queensland Roar at Suncorp Stadium. The game finished 0–0, with both sides taking a point. Sydney only needed a draw to secure their place for a 3rd consecutive finals appearance. The draw means that the top 4 teams (Sydney, Queensland Roar, Central Coast Mariners, Newcastle Jets) are all on 31 points each, although Queensland are on top due to goal difference. Both teams had excellent chances to open the scoring for their club, but good keeping and failure to capitalise on good opportunities meant that many goals went begging. In the end the 32,000 strong crowd at Suncorp Stadium went home feeling disappointed that they didn't get their money's worth for this State of Origin Match.

The final game of the regular season saw Sydney's largest crowd of the season, it drew a large crowd of 33,458 people. Sydney needed to win by at least 2 goals, and they got off to a flying start, with Steve Corica scoring in the 3rd minute. For the rest of the half Melbourne looked shellshocked, and never really recovered from to shock early goal. But they hit back 25 seconds after the break, with Sydney's minds still back in the dressing room, Melbourne midfielder Nick Ward flew down the right wing and took a shot, which ended up rebounding into Sydney defender Mark Milligan, ending up as an own goal. With 15 minutes left in the game Alex Brosque scored, making the score 2–1. But 5 Minutes later Danny Allsopp scored for Melbourne, leaving the final score 2–2. Sydney failed to claim the minor premiership which ended up going to the Central Coast Mariners with their 2–0 victory over the Wellington Phoenix at Gosford. Sydney will now play Queensland Roar in the Semi-Final which is to be held at the Sydney Football Stadium.

On Friday 26 January Sydney played their first leg home final against the Queensland Roar in front of a crowd of 23,450 at the Sydney Football Stadium. The match which was supposed to be played up at Queensland's home ground Suncorp Stadium but it was moved to Sydney because of a concert by the '80s band The Police. Recent matches against the Roar, had all been mostly uneventful affairs, including a 0–0 draw a couple of weeks beforehand, and it was the same again. Both sides had few chances during the 1st half, but Queensland's Brazilian import Reinaldo missed a golden opportunity when he air-swinged a cross in the opening 10 minutes. Sydney's best chance came in the 2nd half when Alex Brosque made a break, got around defender Andrew Packer and only had to slot the ball past the keeper but ended up booting the ball over the crossbar, and into the disappointed 'cove' supporters.
Late in the 2nd half Sydney suffered a blow when midfielder Robbie Middleby was fouled heavily by Roar defender Sasa Ognenovski and injured his hamstring. Middleby is now expected to miss the next leg up in Brisbane, and possibly the Grand Final. Sydney had to chance to get a double late in the game when Brendon Santalab and Patrick missed golden opportunities.

Sydney and Queensland will now play the second leg of the minor semi-final at Suncorp Stadium on 8 February 2008.
Two weeks later Sydney were up in Brisbane to face off in the second leg of the preliminary final. They had suffered a knock-back the day before they flew up with Marquee player Juninho ruled out with a knee injury that he picked up in training. Ruben Zadkovich was announced as his replacement. Sydney started the match well but with many poor decisions by referee Mark Shield including the sending off of Midfielder Robbie Middleby for a tackle, which did not even deserve a yellow. Queensland scored in the 14th minute through their Brazilian import Reinaldo and Sydney never looked like coming back after that. Referee Shield made another poor call when Sydney captain Tony Popović allegedly shoved Roar striker Tahj Minniecon in the penalty box, and Sasa Ognenovski converted the penalty past keeper Clint Bolton. Many Sydney fans were disgusted at the poor display shown by referee Mark Shield, as most games refereed under him have turned out to be fair challenges, and as a result the small Sydney group that had travelled across the border booed him off.

League table

Matches

Semi-finals

2008 Pan-Pacific Championship 

Sydney represented Australia in the inaugural Pan-Pacific Championship held in Hawaii. They placed fourth overall after losing both matches, first to MLS champions Houston Dynamo and then Los Angeles Galaxy in the third place playoff.

Home attendance

A-League Regular Season Total: 180,197

A-League Regular Season Average: 16,382

Season Total: 283,942

Team kit
For the third A-League season, all clubs released new playing strip supplied by sponsor Reebok.  Sydney FC retained the established colours in a new design, a sky blue home shirt with navy blue and orange secondary colours, and a white away shirt with sky blue trim.

Sydney also signed new sponsorships with Sydney-based electronics retailer Bing Lee and electronic brand JVC.  The home strip will feature Bing Lee as the main shirt sponsor with JVC on the shorts, while the away shirt will feature JVC prominently and Bing Lee on the shorts.  A second shirt sponsorship was secured with HBA Health Insurance, that will appear on the back of the shirt below the player number.

Awards 

 Sydney FC Players Player Award: Alex Brosque
 SMH Members Player of the Year Award: Steve Corica
 Chairman Award: John Kosmina
 Forward of the Year: Alex Brosque
 Midfielder of the Year: Steve Corica
 Defender of the Year: Tony Popovic
 Young Player of the Year Award: Adam Biddle
 Golden Boot: Alex Brosque
 Fans Goal of the Year Award: Brendon Santalab (Goal v Adelaide United Round 18)

References

2007-08
2007–08 A-League season by team